Bashirabad (also Romanized as Bashīrābād) is a village in Zirrah Rural District, Sadabad District, Dashtestan County, Bushehr Province, Iran. At the 2006 census, its population was 1,423, in 275 families.

References 

Populated places in Dashtestan County